Turkic literature refers to the literature in any of the Turkic languages:

Azerbaijani literature
Bashkir literature
Kazakh literature
Kyrgyz literature
Tatar literature
Turkish literature
Turkmen literature
Uyghur literature
Uzbek literature